Corinth was a city-state (polis) on the Isthmus of Corinth, the narrow stretch of land that joins the Peloponnese to the mainland of Greece, roughly halfway between Athens and Sparta. Since 1896, systematic archaeological investigations of the Corinth Excavations by the American School of Classical Studies at Athens have revealed large parts of the ancient city, and recent excavations conducted by the Greek Ministry of Culture have brought to light important new facets of antiquity.

For Christians, Corinth is well known from the two letters of Saint Paul in the New Testament, First and Second Corinthians. Corinth is also mentioned in the Acts of the Apostles as part of Paul the Apostle's missionary travels. In addition, the second book of Pausanias' Description of Greece is devoted to Corinth.

Ancient Corinth was one of the largest and most important cities of Greece, with a population of 90,000 in 400 BC. The Romans demolished Corinth in 146 BC, built a new city in its place in 44 BC, and later made it the provincial capital of Greece.

History

Prehistory and founding myths

Neolithic pottery suggests that the site of Corinth was occupied from at least as early as 6500 BC, and continually occupied into the Early Bronze Age, when, it has been suggested, the settlement acted as a centre of trade. However, there is a dramatic drop in ceramic remains during the Early Helladic II phase and only sparse ceramic remains in the EHIII and MH phases; thus, it appears that the area was very sparsely inhabited in the period immediately before the Mycenaean period. There was a settlement on the coast near Lechaion which traded across the Corinthian Gulf; the site of Corinth itself was likely not heavily occupied again until around 900 BC, when it is believed that the Dorians settled there.

According to Corinthian myth as reported by Pausanias, the city was founded by Corinthos, a descendant of the god Zeus. However, other myths suggest that it was founded by the goddess Ephyra, a daughter of the Titan Oceanus, thus the ancient name of the city (also Ephyra).

Some ancient names for the place are derived from a pre-Greek "Pelasgian" language, such as Korinthos. It seems likely that Corinth was also the site of a Bronze Age Mycenaean palace-city, like Mycenae, Tiryns, or Pylos. According to myth, Sisyphus was the founder of a race of ancient kings at Corinth. It was also in Corinth that Jason, the leader of the Argonauts, abandoned Medea. During the Trojan War, as portrayed in the Iliad, the Corinthians participated under the leadership of Agamemnon.

In a Corinthian myth recounted to Pausanias in the 2nd century AD, Briareus, one of the Hecatonchires, was the arbitrator in a dispute between Poseidon and Helios, between the sea and the sun. His verdict was that the Isthmus of Corinth belonged to Poseidon and the acropolis of Corinth (Acrocorinth) belonged to Helios. Helios, the sun god, received the area closest to the sky, while Poseidon, the sea god, got the isthmus by the sea.

The Upper Peirene spring is located within the walls of the acropolis. "The spring, which is behind the temple, they say was the gift of Asopus to Sisyphus. The latter knew, so runs the legend, that Zeus had ravished Aegina, the daughter of Asopus, but refused to give information to the seeker before he had a spring given him on the Acrocorinthus." (Pausanias, 2.5.1). According to legend, the winged horse Pegasus drank at the spring, and was captured and tamed by the Corinthian hero Bellerophon.

Corinth under the Bacchiadae

Corinth had been a backwater in Greece in the 8th century BC. The Bacchiadae (Ancient Greek: Βακχιάδαι Bakkhiadai) were a tightly-knit Doric clan and the ruling kinship group of archaic Corinth in the 8th and 7th centuries BC, a period of expanding Corinthian cultural power. In 747 BC (a traditional date), an aristocracy  ousted the Bacchiadai Prytaneis and reinstituted the kingship, about the time the Kingdom of Lydia (the endonymic Basileia Sfard) was at its greatest, coinciding with the ascent of Basileus Meles, King of Lydia. The Bacchiadae, numbering perhaps a couple of hundred adult males, took power from the last king Telestes (from the House of Sisyphos) in Corinth. The Bacchiads dispensed with kingship and ruled as a group, governing the city by annually electing a prytanis (who held the kingly position for his brief term), probably a council (though none is specifically documented in the scant literary materials), and a polemarchos to head the army.

During Bacchiad rule from 747 to 650 BC, Corinth became a unified state. Large scale public buildings and monuments were constructed at this time. In 733 BC, Corinth established colonies at Corcyra and Syracuse. By 730 BC, Corinth emerged as a highly advanced Greek city with at least 5,000 people.

Aristotle tells the story of Philolaus of Corinth, a Bacchiad who was a lawgiver at Thebes. He became the lover of Diocles, the winner of the Olympic games. They both lived for the rest of their lives in Thebes. Their tombs were built near one another and Philolaus' tomb points toward the Corinthian country, while Diocles' faces away.

In 657 BC, polemarch Cypselus obtained an oracle from Delphi which he interpreted to mean that he should rule the city.
He seized power and exiled the Bacchiadae.

Corinth under the tyrants

Cypselus or Kypselos was the first tyrant of Corinth in the 7th century BC. From 658–628 BC, he removed the Bacchiad aristocracy from power and ruled for three decades. He built temples to Apollo and Poseidon in 650 BC.

Cypselus was the son of Eëtion and a disfigured woman named Labda. He was a member of the Bacchiad kin and usurped the power in archaic matriarchal right of his mother. According to Herodotus, the Bacchiadae heard two prophecies from the Delphic oracle that the son of Eëtion would overthrow their dynasty, and they planned to kill the baby once he was born. However, the newborn smiled at each of the men sent to kill him, and none of them could bear to strike the blow.

Labda then hid the baby in a chest, and the men could not find him once they had composed themselves and returned to kill him. (Compare the infancy of Perseus.) The ivory chest of Cypselus was richly worked and adorned with gold. It was a votive offering at Olympia, where Pausanias gave it a minute description in his 2nd century AD travel guide.

Cypselus grew up and fulfilled the prophecy. Corinth had been involved in wars with Argos and Corcyra, and the Corinthians were unhappy with their rulers. Cypselus was polemarch at the time (around 657 BC), the archon in charge of the military, and he used his influence with the soldiers to expel the king. He also expelled his other enemies, but allowed them to set up colonies in northwestern Greece. 

He also increased trade with the colonies in Italy and Sicily. He was a popular ruler and, unlike many later tyrants, he did not need a bodyguard and died a natural death. Aristotle reports that "Cypselus of Corinth had made a vow that if he became master of the city, he would offer to Zeus the entire property of the Corinthians. Accordingly, he commanded them to make a return of their possessions."

The city sent forth colonists to found new settlements in the 7th century BC, under the rule of Cypselus (r. 657–627 BC) and his son Periander (r. 627–587 BC). Those settlements were Epidamnus (modern day Durrës, Albania), Syracuse, Ambracia, Corcyra (modern day town of Corfu), and Anactorium. Periander also founded Apollonia in Illyria (modern day Fier, Albania) and Potidaea (in Chalcidice). Corinth was also one of the nine Greek sponsor-cities to found the colony of Naukratis in Ancient Egypt, founded to accommodate the increasing trade volume between the Greek world and pharaonic Egypt during the reign of Pharaoh Psammetichus I of the 26th Dynasty.

He ruled for thirty years and was succeeded as tyrant by his son Periander in 627 BC. The treasury that Cypselus built at Delphi was apparently still standing in the time of Herodotus, and the chest of Cypselus was seen by Pausanias at Olympia in the 2nd century AD. Periander brought Corcyra to order in 600 BC.

Periander was considered one of the Seven Wise Men of Greece. During his reign, the first Corinthian coins were struck. He was the first to attempt to cut across the Isthmus to create a seaway between the Corinthian and the Saronic Gulfs. He abandoned the venture due to the extreme technical difficulties that he met, but he created the Diolkos instead (a stone-built overland ramp). The era of the Cypselids was Corinth's golden age, and ended with Periander's nephew , named after the hellenophile Egyptian Pharaoh Psammetichus I (see above).

Periander killed his wife Melissa. His son Lycophron found out and shunned him, and Periander exiled the son to Corcyra. Periander later wanted Lycophron to replace him as ruler of Corinth, and convinced him to come home to Corinth on the condition that Periander go to Corcyra. The Corcyreans heard about this and killed Lycophron to keep away Periander.

Archaic Corinth after the tyrants

581 BC: Periander's nephew and successor was assassinated, ending the tyranny.

581 BC: the Isthmian Games were established by leading families.

570 BC: the inhabitants started to use silver coins called 'colts' or 'foals'.

550 BC: Construction of the Temple of Apollo at Corinth (early third quarter of the 6th century BC).

550 BC: Corinth allied with Sparta.

525 BC: Corinth formed a conciliatory alliance with Sparta against Argos.

519 BC: Corinth mediated between Athens and Thebes.

Around 500 BC: Athenians and Corinthians entreated Spartans not to harm Athens by restoring the tyrant.

Just before the classical period, according to Thucydides, the Corinthians developed the trireme which became the standard warship of the Mediterranean until the late Roman period. Corinth fought the first naval battle on record against the Hellenic city of Corcyra. The Corinthians were also known for their wealth due to their strategic location on the isthmus, through which all land traffic had to pass en route to the Peloponnese, including messengers and traders.

Classical Corinth

In classical times, Corinth rivaled Athens and Thebes in wealth, based on the Isthmian traffic and trade. Until the mid-6th century, Corinth was a major exporter of black-figure pottery to city-states around the Greek world, later losing their market to Athenian artisans.

In classical times and earlier, Corinth had a temple of Aphrodite, the goddess of love, employing some thousand hetairas (temple prostitutes) (see also Temple prostitution in Corinth). The city was renowned for these temple prostitutes, who served the wealthy merchants and the powerful officials who frequented the city. Lais, the most famous hetaira, was said to charge tremendous fees for her extraordinary favours. Referring to the city's exorbitant luxuries, Horace is quoted as saying: "non licet omnibus adire Corinthum" ("Not everyone is able to go to Corinth").

Corinth was also the host of the Isthmian Games. During this era, Corinthians developed the Corinthian order, the third main style of classical architecture after the Doric and the Ionic. The Corinthian order was the most complicated of the three, showing the city's wealth and the luxurious lifestyle, while the Doric order evoked the rigorous simplicity of the Spartans, and the Ionic was a harmonious balance between these two following the cosmopolitan philosophy of Ionians like the Athenians.

The city had two main ports: to the west on the Corinthian Gulf lay Lechaion, which connected the city to its western colonies (Greek: apoikiai) and Magna Graecia, while to the east on the Saronic Gulf the port of Kenchreai served the ships coming from Athens, Ionia, Cyprus and the Levant. Both ports had docks for the city's large navy.

In 491 BC, Corinth mediated between Syracuse and Gela in Sicily.

During the years 481–480 BC, the Conference at the Isthmus of Corinth (following conferences at Sparta) established the Hellenic League, which allied under the Spartans to fight the war against Persia. The city was a major participant in the Persian Wars, sending 400 soldiers to defend Thermopylae and supplying forty warships for the Battle of Salamis under Adeimantos and 5,000 hoplites with their characteristic Corinthian helmets) in the following Battle of Plataea. The Greeks obtained the surrender of Theban collaborators with the Persians. Pausanias took them to Corinth where they were put to death.

Following the Battle of Thermopylae and the subsequent Battle of Artemisium, which resulted in the captures of Euboea, Boeotia, and Attica, the Greco-Persian Wars were at a point where now most of mainland Greece to the north of the Isthmus of Corinth had been overrun.

Herodotus, who was believed to dislike the Corinthians, mentions that they were considered the second best fighters after the Athenians.

In 458 BC, Corinth was defeated by Athens at Megara.

Peloponnesian War

In 435 BC, Corinth and its colony Corcyra went to war over Epidamnus. In 433 BC, Athens allied with Corcyra against Corinth. The Corinthian war against the Corcyrans was the largest naval battle between Greek city states until that time. In 431 BC, one of the factors leading to the Peloponnesian War was the dispute between Corinth and Athens over Corcyra, which possibly stemmed from the traditional trade rivalry between the two cities or, as Thucydides relates - the dispute over the colony of Epidamnus.

The Syracusans sent envoys to Corinth and Sparta to seek allies against Athenian invasion. The Corinthians "voted at once to aid [the Syracusans] heart and soul". The Corinthians also sent a group to Lacedaemon to rouse Spartan assistance. After a convincing speech from the Athenian renegade Alcibiades, the Spartans agreed to send troops to aid the Sicilians.

In 404 BC, Sparta refused to destroy Athens, angering the Corinthians. Corinth joined Argos, Boeotia, and Athens against Sparta in the Corinthian War.

Demosthenes later used this history in a plea for magnanimous statecraft, noting that the Athenians of yesteryear had had good reason to hate the Corinthians and Thebans for their conduct during the Peloponnesian War, yet they bore no malice whatever.

Corinthian War

In 395 BC, after the end of the Peloponnesian War, Corinth and Thebes, dissatisfied with the hegemony of their Spartan allies, moved to support Athens against Sparta in the Corinthian War.

As an example of facing danger with knowledge, Aristotle used the example of the Argives who were forced to confront the Spartans in the battle at the Long Walls of Corinth in 392 BC.

379–323 BC

In 379 BC, Corinth, switching back to the Peloponnesian League, joined Sparta in an attempt to defeat Thebes and eventually take over Athens.

In 366 BC, the Athenian Assembly ordered Chares to occupy the Athenian ally and install a democratic government. This failed when Corinth, Phlius and Epidaurus allied with Boeotia.

Demosthenes recounts how Athens had fought the Spartans in a great battle near Corinth. The city decided not to harbor the defeated Athenian troops, but instead sent heralds to the Spartans. But the Corinthian heralds opened their gates to the defeated Athenians and saved them. Demosthenes notes that they “chose along with you, who had been engaged in battle, to suffer whatever might betide, rather than without you to enjoy a safety that involved no danger.”

These conflicts further weakened the city-states of the Peloponnese and set the stage for the conquests of Philip II of Macedon.

Demosthenes warned that Philip's military force exceeded that of Athens and thus they must develop a tactical advantage. He noted the importance of a citizen army as opposed to a mercenary force, citing the mercenaries of Corinth who fought alongside citizens and defeated the Spartans.

In 338 BC, after having defeated Athens and its allies, Philip II created the League of Corinth to unite Greece (included Corinth and Macedonia) in the war against Persia. Philip was named hegemon of the League.

In the spring of 337 BC, the Second congress of Corinth established the Common Peace.

Hellenistic period
By 332 BC, Alexander the Great was in control of Greece, as hegemon.

During the Hellenistic period, Corinth, like many other Greece cities, never quite had autonomy. Under the successors of Alexander the Great, Greece was contested ground, and Corinth was occasionally the battleground for contests between the Antigonids, based in Macedonia, and other Hellenistic powers. In 308 BC, the city was captured from the Antigonids by Ptolemy I, who claimed to come as a liberator of Greece from the Antigonids. However, the city was recaptured by Demetrius in 304 BC.

Corinth remained under Antigonid control for half a century. After 280 BC, it was ruled by the faithful governor Craterus; but, in 253/2 BC, his son Alexander of Corinth, moved by Ptolemaic subsidies, resolved to challenge the Macedonian supremacy and seek independence as a tyrant. He was probably poisoned in 247 BC; after his death, the Macedonian king Antigonus II Gonatas retook the city in the winter of 245/44 BC.

The Macedonian rule was short-lived. In 243 BC, Aratus of Sicyon, using a surprise attack, captured the fortress of Acrocorinth and convinced the citizenship to join the Achaean League.

Thanks to an alliance agreement with Aratus, the Macedonians recovered Corinth once again in 224 BC; but, after the Roman intervention in 197 BC, the city was permanently brought into the Achaean League. Under the leadership of Philopoemen, the Achaeans went on to take control of the entire Peloponnesus and made Corinth the capital of their confederation.

Roman era

In 146 BC, Rome declared war on the Achaean League and, after victories over league forces in the summer of that year, the Romans under Lucius Mummius besieged and captured Corinth. When he entered the city, Mummius killed all the men and sold the women and children into slavery before burning the city, for which he was given the cognomen Achaicus as the conqueror of the Achaean League. There is archeological evidence of some minimal habitation in the years afterwards, but Corinth remained largely deserted until Julius Caesar refounded the city as Colonia Laus Iulia Corinthiensis (‘colony of Corinth in honour of Julius’) in 44 BC, shortly before his assassination. At this time, an amphitheatre was built. (
)

Under the Romans, Corinth was rebuilt as a major city in Southern Greece or Achaia. It had a large mixed population of Romans, Greeks, and Jews. The city was an important locus for activities of The Roman Imperial Cult, and both Temple E and the Julian Basilica have been suggested as locations of imperial cult activity.

Biblical Corinth

Corinth is mentioned many times in the New Testament, largely in connection with Paul the Apostle's mission there, testifying to the success of Caesar's refounding of the city. Traditionally, the Church of Corinth is believed to have been founded by Paul, making it an Apostolic See.

The apostle Paul first visited the city in AD 49 or 50, when Gallio, the brother of Seneca, was proconsul of Achaia. Paul resided here for eighteen months (see ). Here he first became acquainted with Priscilla and Aquila, with whom he later traveled. They worked here together as tentmakers (from which is derived the modern Christian concept of tentmaking), and regularly attended the synagogue.
In AD 51/52, Gallio presided over the trial of the Apostle Paul in Corinth. This event provides a secure date for the book of the Acts of the Apostles within the Bible. Silas and Timothy rejoined Paul here, having last seen him in Berea.  suggests that Jewish refusal to accept his preaching here led Paul to resolve no longer to speak in the synagogues where he travelled: "From now on I will go to the Gentiles". However, on his arrival in Ephesus, the narrative records that Paul went to the synagogue to preach.

Paul wrote at least two epistles to the Christian church, the First Epistle to the Corinthians (written from Ephesus) and the Second Epistle to the Corinthians (written from Macedonia). The first Epistle occasionally reflects the conflict between the thriving Christian church and the surrounding community.

Some scholars believe that Paul visited Corinth for an intermediate "painful visit" (see ) between the first and second epistles. After writing the second epistle, he stayed in Corinth for about three months in the late winter, and there wrote his Epistle to the Romans.

Based on clues within the Corinthian epistles themselves, some scholars have concluded that Paul wrote possibly as many as four epistles to the church at Corinth. Only two are contained within the Christian canon (First and Second Epistles to the Corinthians); the other two letters are lost. (The lost letters would probably represent the very first letter that Paul wrote to the Corinthians and the third one, and so the First and Second Letters of the canon would be the second and the fourth if four were written.) Many scholars think that the third one (known as the "letter of the tears"; see 2 Cor 2:4) is included inside the canonical Second Epistle to the Corinthians (it would be chapters 10–13). This letter is not to be confused with the so-called "Third Epistle to the Corinthians", which is a pseudepigraphical letter written many years after the death of Paul.

There are speculations from Bruce Winter that the Jewish access to their own food in Corinth was disallowed after Paul's departure. By this theory, Paul had instructed Christian Gentiles to maintain Jewish access to food according to their dietary laws. This speculation is contested by Rudolph who argues that there is no evidence to support this theory. He instead argues that Paul had desired the Gentile Christians to remain assimilated within their Gentile communities and not adopt Jewish dietary procedures.

Byzantine era

The city was largely destroyed in the earthquakes of AD 365 and AD 375, followed by Alaric's invasion in 396. The city was rebuilt after these disasters on a monumental scale, but covered a much smaller area than previously. Four churches were located in the city proper, another on the citadel of the Acrocorinth, and a monumental basilica at the port of Lechaion.

During the reign of Emperor Justinian I (527–565), a large stone wall was erected from the Saronic to the Corinthian gulfs, protecting the city and the Peloponnese peninsula from the barbarian invasions from the north. The stone wall was about six miles (10 km) long and was named Hexamilion ("six-miles").

Corinth declined from the 6th century on, and may even have fallen to barbarian invaders in the early 7th century. The main settlement moved from the lower city to the Acrocorinth. Despite its becoming the capital of the theme of Hellas and, after c. 800, of the theme of the Peloponnese, it was not until the 9th century that the city began to recover, reaching its apogee in the 11th and 12th centuries, when it was the site of a flourishing silk industry.

In November 856, an earthquake in Corinth killed an estimated 45,000.

The wealth of the city attracted the attention of the Italo-Normans under Roger of Sicily, who plundered it in 1147, carrying off many captives, most notably silk weavers. The city never fully recovered from the Norman sack.

Principality of Achaea
Following the sack of Constantinople by the Fourth Crusade, a group of Crusaders under the French knights William of Champlitte and Geoffrey of Villehardouin carried out the conquest of the Peloponnese. The Corinthians resisted the Frankish conquest from their stronghold in Acrocorinth, under the command of Leo Sgouros, from 1205 until 1210. In 1208 Leo Sgouros killed himself by riding off the top of Acrocorinth, but resistance continued for two more years. Finally, in 1210 the fortress fell to the Crusaders, and Corinth became a full part of the Principality of Achaea, governed by the Villehardouins from their capital in Andravida in Elis. Corinth was the last significant town of Achaea on its northern borders with another crusader state, the Duchy of Athens. The Ottomans captured the city in 1395. The Byzantines of the Despotate of the Morea recaptured it in 1403, and the Despot Theodore II Palaiologos, restored the Hexamilion wall across the Isthmus of Corinth in 1415.

Ottoman rule
In 1458, five years after the final Fall of Constantinople, the Turks of the Ottoman Empire conquered the city and its mighty castle. The Ottomans renamed it Gördes and made it a sanjak (district) centre within the Rumelia Eyalet. The Venetians captured the city in 1687 during the Morean War, and it remained under Venetian control until the Ottomans retook the city in 1715. Corinth was the capital of the Mora Eyalet in 1715–1731 and then again a sanjak capital until 1821.

Independence

During the Greek War of Independence, 1821–1830 the city was contested by the Ottoman forces. The city was officially liberated in 1832 after the Treaty of London. In 1833, the site was considered among the candidates for the new capital city of the recently founded Kingdom of Greece, due to its historical significance and strategic position. Nafplio was chosen initially, then Athens.

Modern Corinth

In 1858, the village surrounding the ruins of Ancient Corinth was destroyed by an earthquake, leading to the establishment of New Corinth  NE of the ancient city.

Ancient city and its environs

Acrocorinth, the acropolis

Acrocorinthis, the acropolis of ancient Corinth, is a monolithic rock that was continuously occupied from archaic times to the early 19th century. The city's archaic acropolis, already an easily defensible position due to its geomorphology, was further heavily fortified during the Byzantine Empire as it became the seat of the strategos of the Thema of Hellas. Later it was a fortress of the Franks after the Fourth Crusade, the Venetians and the Ottoman Turks. With its secure water supply, Acrocorinth's fortress was used as the last line of defense in southern Greece because it commanded the isthmus of Corinth, repelling foes from entry into the Peloponnesian peninsula. Three circuit walls formed the man-made defense of the hill. The highest peak on the site was home to a temple to Aphrodite which was Christianized as a church, and then became a mosque. The American School began excavations on it in 1929. Currently, Acrocorinth is one of the most important medieval castle sites of Greece.

Two ports: Lechaeum and Cenchreae
Corinth had two harbours: Lechaeum on the Corinthian Gulf and Cenchreae on the Saronic Gulf. Lechaeum was the principal port, connected to the city with a set of long walls of about  length, and was the main trading station for Italy and Sicily, where there were many Corinthian colonies, while Cenchreae served the commerce with the Eastern Mediterranean. Ships could be transported between the two harbours by means of the diolkos constructed by the tyrant Periander.

Important monuments 

 Acrocorinth Sanctuary of Demeter and Kore
 
 
 Bema (Ancient Corinth) (later Church of Apostle Paul)
 
 Peirene
 
 Sacred Spring of Corinth

Notable people

Ancient Greece
 Achaicus (1st century AD), Christian
 Adrian of Corinth (3rd century AD), Christian saint and martyr
 Archias (8th century BC), founder of Syracuse
 Desmon (8th century BC), athlete
 Dinarchus (4th century BC), orator and logographer
 Diocles (8th century BC), athlete
 Diogenes of Sinope, 4th century BC, one of the world's best known cynics
 Eumelus (8th century BC), poet
 Euphranor (4th century BC), sculptor and painter
 Periander (7th century BC), listed as one of the Seven Sages of Greece
 Quadratus (4th century AD), Christian saint and martyr
 Timoleon (4th century BC), statesman and general
 Xeniades (5th century BC), philosopher
 Xenophon (5th century BC), athlete

Medieval
 Cyriacus the Anchorite (5th century), Christian saint
 William of Moerbeke (13th century), first translator of Aristotle's works into Latin

In literature
 Alcmaeon in Corinth, a play by Greek dramatist Euripides, premiered in 405 BC
 The Queen of Corinth, a play by English dramatist John Fletcher, published in 1647

See also

 Corinthian bronze
 Corinthian helmet
 Isthmian Games
 Temple of Isthmia

References

Further reading
 Adkins, Lesley and Roy A. Adkins. Handbook to Life in Ancient Greece. New York: Facts on File. 1997.
 Alcock, Susan E. and Robin Osborne (ed.s). Classical Archaeology Malden: Blackwell Publishing. 2007.
 Del Chiaro, Mario A (ed). Corinthiaca: Studies in Honor of Darrell A. Amyx. Columbia: University of Missouri Press. 1986.
 Dixon, M. Late Classical and Early Hellenistic Corinth: 338–196 BC. London: Routledge. 2014.
 Friesen, Steven J., Daniel N. Schowalter, James C. Walters (ed.), Corinth in Context: Comparative Studies on Religion and Society. Supplements to Novum Testamentum, 134.   Leiden; Boston:  Brill, 2010.
 Gebhard, Elizabeth R. and Timothy E. Gregory (ed.), Bridge of the Untiring Sea: The Corinthian Isthmus from Prehistory to Late Antiquity. Hesperia Supplement, 48.   Princeton, NJ:  American School of Classical Studies at Athens, 2015.
 Grant, Michael. The Rise of the Greeks. New York: Macmillan Publishing Company. 1987.
 Grummond, Nancy T.; Ridgway, Brunilde S., From Pergamon to Sperlonga: Sculpture and Context, University of California Press, 2000, . Google books.
 Hammond, A History of Greece. Oxford University Press. 1967. History of Greece, including Corinth from the early civilizations (6000–850) to the splitting of the empire and Antipater's occupation of Greece (323–321).
 Kagan, Donald. The Fall of the Athenian Empire. New York: Cornell University Press. 1987.
 Romano, David Gilman. Athletics and Mathematics in Archaic Corinth: the Origins of the Greek Stadion. Memoirs of the American Philosophical Society, vol. 206. 1993.
 Salmon, J. B. Wealthy Corinth: A History of the City to 338 BC. Oxford: Clarendon Press. 1984.
 Scahill, David. The Origins of the Corinthian Capital. In Structure, Image, Ornament: Architectural Sculpture in the Greek World. Edited by Peter Schultz and Ralf von den Hoff, 40–53. Oxford: Oxbow. 2009.
 Tartaron, Thomas F., Daniel J. Pullen, Timothy E. Gregory, Jay S. Noller, Richard M. Rothaus, William R. Caraher, Joseph L. Rife, David K. Pettegrew, Lisa Tzortzopoulou-Gregory, Dimitri Nakassis, and Robert Schon.  "The Eastern Korinthia Archaeological Survey: Integrated Methods for a Dynamic Landscape." Hesperia 75:453–523, 2006.
 Will, E. Korinthiaka. Recherches sur l'histoire et la civilisation de Corinthe des origines aux guerres médiques. Paris : de Boccard, 1955.
 British Admiralty charts: BA1085, BA1093, BA1600
 Results of the American School of Classical Studies Corinth Excavations published in Corinth Volumes I to XX, Princeton.
 Excavation reports and articles in Hesperia, Princeton.
 Partial text from Easton's Bible Dictionary, 1897

External links

 Ancient Corinth – The Complete Guide
 Hellenic Ministry of Culture: Fortress of Acrocorinth
 Excavations at Ancient Corinth (American School of Classical Studies at Athens)
 Online database of the Corinth Excavations (American School of Classical Studies at Athens)
 History timeline
 Coins of Ancient Corinth (Greek)
 Coins of Ancient Corinth under the Romans

 
7th-century BC establishments in Greece
Ancient Greek archaeological sites in Peloponnese (region)
Greek city-states
Pauline churches
Populated places in ancient Corinthia
Principality of Achaea
Roman sites in Greece
4th-century BC disestablishments in Greece